Henry Homer "Doc" Gessler (December 23, 1880 – December 27, 1924) was a Major League Baseball player born in Indiana, Pennsylvania, who began his eight-season career, at the age of 22, with the Detroit Tigers in . He played mainly as a right fielder in a career that totaled 880 games played, 2969 at bats, 831 hits, 363 RBIs and 14 home runs. Doc died of tuberculosis in his home-town of Indiana at the age of 44, and is interred in Saint Bernard Cemetery in Indiana, Pennsylvania.

College years

Before his baseball career, he attended Ohio University, Washington & Jefferson College, and became a physician, graduating from Johns Hopkins Medical School. He was one of three doctors in the 1906 World Series (with Doc White and Frank Owen).

Career

After his short stay with Detroit, he then moved on to the Brooklyn Superbas in an unknown transaction. For Brooklyn, he became a good hitter, batting .290 in both of his full seasons with them.

He did not play in the Majors for the  season, but reappeared for the  Boston Red Sox and batted .308, hit 14 triples, and led the American League in on-base percentage. The following season, manager Fred Lake announced that Doc would be team's Captain for the  season. This situation did not last the season, as he was traded to the Washington Senators on September 9, 1909 in exchange for Charlie Smith. He played three seasons for the Senators and retired after the  season.

In eight seasons, Gessler posted a .280 batting average  with 370 runs, 127 doubles, 50 triples, 14 home runs, 142 stolen bases, 333 bases on balls, .370 on-base percentage and .370 slugging percentage. He finished his career with a .959 fielding percentage playing at right field and first base.

Managerial stint

The team soon adopted the nickname Rebels after their new manager, who remained their manager through the 1914 season, and the entire  season.

References

External links

1880 births
1924 deaths
Baseball players from Pennsylvania
Major League Baseball right fielders
Detroit Tigers players
Brooklyn Superbas players
Chicago Cubs players
Boston Red Sox players
Washington Senators (1901–1960) players
Ohio Bobcats baseball players
People from Greensburg, Pennsylvania
Washington & Jefferson Presidents baseball players
Newark Sailors players
Columbus Senators players
Kansas City Blues (baseball) players
Johns Hopkins University alumni